Steven Michael Gregory (born 19 March 1987) is an English former footballer who played as a midfielder.

Club career

Wycombe Wanderers
Gregory began his career as a 15-year-old in the youth ranks of Wycombe Wanderers, his highlight being captaining the side in the Berks & Bucks Senior Cup final win over Milton Keynes Dons.
Gregory made his Football League debut for the Chairboys on 6 May 2006, coming on for Matt Bloomfield in the second half in a 2–0 victory against Peterborough United. During his time with Wycombe he was sent out on loan to Havant and Waterlooville and Hayes & Yeading United.

Hayes and Yeading United
At the end of the 2007–08 season, his contract at Wycombe was not extended and Gregory signed for Hayes & Yeading United, for whom he went on to score two crucial goals in the play-off final against Hampton and Richmond Borough on 7 May 2009 as they won promotion to the Conference National.

First spell at AFC Wimbledon
In summer 2009, Gregory signed for AFC Wimbledon. On 9 November 2009, he made his first FA Cup appearance in the club's 4–1 loss to Millwall. Gregory featured as a regular for the first team during their Football League promotion winning season, and was a member of the starting eleven that beat Luton Town in the Conference National Play-off Final, winning the Dons promotion to League Two.

AFC Bournemouth and loan spell
On 30 June 2011, League One club AFC Bournemouth signed the player for an undisclosed fee. He made twenty three league starts for the Cherries during 2011–12, but found his opportunities limited at the start of the 2012–13 campaign, finding himself significantly down the pecking order at the club. For this reason it was decided that Gregory should be sent out on loan, and he opted for his former club AFC Wimbledon as soon as he received the request from the Dons first team coach Simon Bassey. In December 2012, following his return from a loan with AFC Wimbledon, his contract with Bournemouth was cancelled by mutual consent.

Gillingham
Shortly after the conclusion of the loan, he signed for Gillingham. He was released by the club at the end of the 2013–14 season. In total, Gregory made 55 league appearances for the "Gills".

Thame United
On 10 July 2016, it was announced that Gregory had  signed for Hellenic Football League Premier Division side Thame United. He made his debut on 2 August against Burnham, scoring his first goal for the club. Gregory was promoted with United in his first season for the club.

International career
Gregory appeared twice for England C, playing in matches against Wales in 2010 and Belgium in 2011.

Honours
AFC Wimbledon
Conference National play-offs: 2010–11
Thame United
Hellenic League Premier Division champions: 2016-17

References

External links

1987 births
Living people
English footballers
England semi-pro international footballers
Association football midfielders
Wycombe Wanderers F.C. players
Hayes & Yeading United F.C. players
Havant & Waterlooville F.C. players
AFC Wimbledon players
AFC Bournemouth players
Gillingham F.C. players
Thame United F.C. players
English Football League players
National League (English football) players